The 2009 Albanian Cup Final was the 57th final of the Albanian Cup. The final was played at Niko Dovana Stadium in Durrës on 6 May 2009. The match was contested by Tirana, who beat Elbasani in their semi-final, and Flamurtari who beat Shkumbini. After Rezart Dabulla opened the scoring with a header after 42 minutes, Devis Mema equalised in the 65th minute before Hair Zeqiri scored the winner in the 92nd minute to give Flamurtari their third Albanian Cup success.

Match

Details

References

Cup Final
Albanian Cup Finals
Albanian Cup Final, 2009
Albanian Cup Final, 2009